The State Register of Heritage Places is maintained by the Heritage Council of Western Australia. , 97 places are heritage-listed in the Shire of Chapman Valley, of which eight are on the State Register of Heritage Places.

List
The Western Australian State Register of Heritage Places, lists the following eight state registered places within the Shire of Chapman Valley:

References

Chapman
Chapman